Sir Ernest Joseph Soares (20 October 1864 – 15 March 1926), of 36 Princes Gate, London, and of Upcott House  in the parish of Pilton, near Barnstaple in North Devon, was a British solicitor and Liberal politician.

Origins
Soares was the son of José Luís Xavier Soares, a Liverpool merchant of Indian origin tracing his roots to Ucassaim, Goa in Portuguese India and Hannah Hollingsworth of Liverpool.

Prior to conversion to Christianity the family were Gaud Saraswat Brahmins with the surname Gaitonde.

Career

He was educated at St John's College, Cambridge, where he read law. He was a partner in Allen, Prestage and Soares, solicitors, of Manchester. In 1900 he was elected to the House of Commons for Barnstaple, and rented Upcott House, where he was resident in 1901, a large white stucco Georgian mansion one mile from the centre of Barnstaple and a prominent landmark for the voters and inhabitants of that town, from Sir William Robert Williams, 3rd Baronet of nearby Heanton Court. He served in the Liberal administration of H. H. Asquith as a Junior Lord of the Treasury from 1910 to 1911. The latter year failing health forced him to resign this post and his seat in the House of Commons. He was knighted the same year.

Marriage and children
When Soares was working as a solicitor in Manchester and residing at Woodheys, on Washway Road, in Ashton upon Mersey (today Sale), he married Kate Carolyn Lord (1864-1932), daughter of his then near-neighbour Samuel Lord (1803-1889), the British-born American retail millionaire and founder of Lord & Taylor today the oldest luxury department store in the United States. Lord was born in Saddleworth, West Riding of Yorkshire, and emigrated to America in about 1821. Having retired from managing his retail empire, in 1866 he returned to England and resided at Oakleigh, on The Avenue in Ashton upon Mersey. Lord left nine million dollars (£1.848 million) at his death. By his wife Soares had one daughter and only child:
Kate Rose Mary Soares (b. 1894), who married Captain Walter Bell (1880–1954), MC, known as Karamojo Bell, the Scottish adventurer and African big game hunter.

Death
He died in Mayfair, London, in March 1926, at the age of 61.

References

Biography of Sir Ernest Soares at The Luso Pages
 Profiles of Eminent Goans, Past and Present; Clement J Vaz; published 1997; pg 262.

External links 
 

1864 births
1926 deaths
UK MPs 1900–1906
UK MPs 1910
UK MPs 1910–1918
Liberal Party (UK) MPs for English constituencies
Alumni of St John's College, Cambridge
Knights Bachelor
British politicians of Indian descent
English people of Indian descent
British people of Goan descent
Members of the Parliament of the United Kingdom for Barnstaple